CityMall Bacalso is a community mall located in N. Bacalso Avenue, Cebu City developed by DoubleDragon Properties. It sits on a  property located between Elizabeth Mall and Cebu South Bus Terminal.

History
In June 2014, DoubleDragon Properties announced that its subsidiary CityMall Commercial Centers Inc. (CMCCI) signed a 30-year lease agreement with Dunes and Eagle Land Development Corp. for a commercial lot along N. Bacalso Avenue, Cebu City where a Grand CityMall will be constructed. It was expected to be completed in 2015 but the project hit a snag when stockholders of the dissolved Ludo and Luym Development Corp. (LudoDev) appealed to desist the construction since the lot was transferred illegally to DoubleDragon Properties pending the result of a court case.

Its construction was further halted on February 22, 2017 by Cebu City's Office of the Building Official (OBO) after the crane rented by Metro Dyna Build Incorporated (MDBI), the mall's contractor, collapsed on four houses and injured one woman.

The mall finally opened on April 30, 2022 with MerryMart Grocery as the anchor store.

See also
Elizabeth Mall
Ayala Center Cebu
SM City Cebu
SM City Consolacion
SM Seaside City Cebu
Robinsons Galleria Cebu

References

External links
CityMall

Shopping malls in Cebu City